Américaeconomía is a Latin American magazine founded in 1986 by Chilean Elías Selman and Swede Nils Strandberg. The magazine is headquartered in Santiago, Chile.

Beginning 
The 1980s is considered the 'lost decade' in Latin America. During these years, Selman and Strandberg decided to start a Latin American business magazine. 

Since 1986, américaeconomía has been analysing business, economics and finance news in Latin America. It is published monthly in Spanish and Portuguese. The editors and journalists of the magazine are stationed in Santiago,  Buenos Aires, Lima, Bogotá, Mexico City, São Paulo, and Miami. The magazine is also supported by a network of correspondents around the world who cover international business from a Latin American perspective. 

Since 1993, américaeconomía has conducted research and rankings on topics of interest to senior executives and entrepreneurs from Latin America.

References

External links
 Official Spanish site
 Portuguese site

1986 establishments in Chile
Magazines established in 1986
Magazines published in Chile
Business magazines
Portuguese-language magazines
Spanish-language magazines
Mass media in Santiago